James Jack may refer to
 James Jack (artist) (born 1979), American Asian contemporary artist
 James Jack (trade unionist) (1910–1987), Scottish trade unionist
 James Jack (1731–1822), American who carried the Mecklenburg Declaration of Independence
 Julian Jack (James Julian Bennett Jack, born 1936), New Zealand physiologist
 James Lochhead Jack (1880–1962), British Army officer
 James Millar Jack (1847/48–1912), Scottish trade unionist

See also
 James Jacks (1947–2014), American film producer